Black Torrington is a village and civil parish in mid Devon, England, situated between the towns of Holsworthy and Hatherleigh. It is located on and named after the River Torridge.

Within the village is a small but well maintained 15th-century Church of England parish church dedicated to St Mary. There is also a Church of England run primary school adjacent to the church.

The church is of medieval origin, with a 14th-century chancel, with much of the rest dating from about 1500.

External links

 Black Torrington Primary School website

Villages in Devon
Torridge District